Helsdingenia ceylonica, is a species of spider of the genus Helsdingenia. It is found only in Nepal and Sri Lanka.

See also
 List of Linyphiidae species

References

Linyphiidae
Endemic fauna of Nepal
Endemic fauna of Sri Lanka
Spiders of Asia
Spiders described in 1985